Packed meal may refer to:
 Bento, Japanese packed meal
 Dosirak, Korean packed meal
 Packed lunch
 Tiffin, Indian packed meal